Northern Beaches Christian School is an independent non-denominational Christian co-educational primary and secondary day school, located in Terrey Hills, Sydney, Australia.

Established in 1981, the school provides a general and religious education for approximately 1,200 students from Year K to Year 12. The school is affiliated with Macquarie University.

Overview 
The school completed its multi-purpose hall named after Australian actress Marina Prior and a shared learning space called 'SCIL' named after the school's educational enrichment project of the same name in 2009. The two buildings were officially opened by the school's Board of Directors and local MP Bronwyn Bishop.

The school is known for its inclusive nature, catering for a diversity of students. The school also has a strong policy against harassment, with a number of students suspended each year due to harassment complaints.

The school has a Global Opportunities Program which aims to build global bridges through community partnership, cultural understanding and shared learning. GO projects have involved sending teams of staff and students to Cambodia, Rwanda, Uganda and Moree. GO teams work in a range of contexts, including running children's programs, English literacy development, and professional development for local teachers.

Sydney Centre for Innovation in Learning 
The Sydney Centre for Innovation in Learning (SCIL) is both an online learning project run by NBCS and the name of the recently completed modern, learning environment whose design was based on the core ideas behind SCIL of online, technologically enriched learning.

NBCS provides online courses for students studying for their Higher School Certificate via their HSC Learn Online program. Courses are for students both in their final year (Year 12 in New South Wales) and students studying preliminary HSC courses in Year 11.

Notable alumni 
 Callum Millsan Australian rules football player, currently contracted to the Sydney Swans

See also

 List of non-government schools in New South Wales

References

External links 
 Northern Beaches Christian School website
 Sydney Centre for Innovation in Learning website
 HSC Learn Online website

Educational institutions established in 1981
1981 establishments in Australia
Private secondary schools in Sydney
Private schools Northern Beaches Sydney
Private primary schools in Sydney
Nondenominational Christian schools in Sydney